Venable Ice Shelf is an ice shelf, 40 miles (60 km) long and 15 miles (24 km) wide, between Fletcher and Allison Peninsulas, Ellsworth Land. It was mapped by the United States Geological Survey from surveys and U.S. Navy air photos, 1961–66, and named by the Advisory Committee on Antarctic Names for Cdm. J. D. Venable, U.S. Navy, Ships Operations Officer, U.S. Naval Support Force, Antarctica, 1967 and 1968.

Further reading 

External links 

 Venable Ice Shelf on USGS website
 Venable Ice Shelf on AADC website
 Venable Ice Shelf on SCAR website

References 

Ice shelves of Antarctica
Bodies of ice of Ellsworth Land